Edmonston is a surname. Notable people with the surname include:

James Ronald Edmonston Charles (1875–1955), British officer in the Royal Engineers
Phil Edmonston (1944-2022), Canadian consumer advocate, writer and former politician
Sam Edmonston (1883–1979), American pitcher in Major League Baseball
Susan Edmonston Ferrier (1782–1854), Scottish novelist

See also
Edmonston House, New Windsor, Orange County, New York, United States
Edmonston, Maryland, town in Prince George's County, Maryland, United States
Edmonston Pumping Plant, pumping station near the south end of the California Aqueduct, United States
Edmondston
Edmondstown
Edmonson (disambiguation)
Edmonstone
Edmonton